Donald Clayton Spencer (April 25, 1912 – December 23, 2001) was an American mathematician, known for work on deformation theory of structures arising in differential geometry, and on several complex variables from the point of view of partial differential equations. He was born in Boulder, Colorado, and educated at the University of Colorado and MIT.

Career
He wrote a Ph.D. in diophantine approximation under J. E. Littlewood and G.H. Hardy at the University of Cambridge, completed in 1939. He had positions at MIT and Stanford before his appointment in 1950 at Princeton University. There he was involved in a series of collaborative works with Kunihiko Kodaira on the deformation of complex structures, which had some influence on the theory of complex manifolds and algebraic geometry, and the conception of moduli spaces.

He also was led to formulate the d-bar Neumann problem, for the operator  (see complex differential form) in PDE theory, to extend Hodge theory and the n-dimensional Cauchy–Riemann equations to the non-compact case. This is used to show existence theorems for holomorphic functions.

He later worked on pseudogroups and their deformation theory, based on a fresh approach to overdetermined systems of PDEs (bypassing the Cartan–Kähler ideas based on differential forms by making an intensive use of jets). Formulated at the level of various chain complexes, this gives rise to what is now called Spencer cohomology, a subtle and difficult theory both of formal and of analytical structure. This is a kind of Koszul complex theory, taken up by numerous mathematicians during the 1960s. In particular a  theory for Lie equations formulated by Malgrange emerged, giving a very broad formulation of the notion of integrability.

Legacy
After his death, a mountain peak outside Silverton, Colorado was named in his honor.

See also
Kodaira–Spencer mapping
Salem–Spencer set

Publications

References

External links

1912 births
2001 deaths
20th-century American mathematicians
Alumni of Trinity College, Cambridge
Massachusetts Institute of Technology alumni
National Medal of Science laureates
People from Boulder, Colorado
Princeton University faculty
University of Colorado alumni